The Right Night & Barry White is the self-produced sixteenth album by American R&B singer Barry White, which was released in 1987 on A&M Records. The album peaked at No. 28 on the Billboard Top R&B Albums chart.

Track listings 
 "Good Dancin' Music" (Barry White, Jack Perry) – 7:05
 "As Time Goes By" (Herman Hupfeld) – 5:51
 "Sho' You Right" (White, Perry) – 7:43
 "For Your Love (I'll Do Most Anything)" (White, Bryan Loren) – 6:23
 "There's a Place (Where Love Never Ends)" (White, Frieda Brock, Doug Lambert) – 7:25
 "Love Is in Your Eyes" (White, Perry, Don Williams) – 7:22
 "I'm Ready for Love" (White, Lambert, Edward R. Martinez) – 5:09
 "Share" (White, Charles Fearing) – 7:05
 "Who's the Fool" (White, Perry, Eugene Booker) – 6:36
 "The Right Night" (White) – 6:32

Canada LP
 "Sho' You Right" (White, Perry) – 7:43
 "For Your Love (I'll Do Most Anything)" (White, Bryan Loren) – 4:24
 "There's a Place (Where Love Never Ends)" (White, Frieda Brock, Doug Lambert) – 5:32
 "Love Is in Your Eyes" (White, Perry, Don Williams) – 5:55
 "Theme" - 0:33
 "The Right Night" (White) – 5:50
 "I'm Ready for Love" (White, Lambert, Edward R. Martinez) – 5:11
 "Theme" - 0:32
 "Share" (White, Charles Fearing) – 7:05
 "Who's the Fool" (White, Perry, Eugene Booker) – 6:36

Singles 
 "Sho' You Right" (US R&B No. 17, UK No. 14)
 "For Your Love (I'll Do Most Anything)" (US R&B No. 27, UK No. 94)

Personnel
Barry White – lead vocals, keyboards, bass, drums, percussion
Eugene Booker, Doug Lambert, Bryan Loren, Jack Perry – keyboards
Melvin "Wah Wah" Watson – guitars, backing vocals
Nathan East – bass
Al Chalk – percussion
Thomas Alvarado – tenor saxophone
James Bailey, Kenny Harris, Stephanie Haynes, Brenda Holloway, Cheryl James, Diane Taylor, Sharon-Lyn Rochelle, Kathy Thompson, Glodean White – backing vocals
Strings arranged by Gene Page

Charts

Certifications and sales

References

Barry White albums
1987 albums
A&M Records albums